Hinemoa was an early film produced in New Zealand in 1914. It was claimed to be the first feature film produced in New Zealand, although it should not be confused with a film of the same name shot by Gaston Méliès a year earlier. It was billed as "The first big dramatic work filmed and acted in the land of the Moa".

Plot
The film told the Māori legend of Hinemoa and Tutanekai. No prints are known to have survived.

Production
The £50 budget was funded by Edward Anderson, of the Auckland Chamber of Commerce
The film was shot on location around Rotorua in only 8 days. All the cast members were drawn from the Reverend F.A. Bennett's Māori choir.

Legacy
The film opened at the Lyric Theatre, Auckland during the first week of World War I, and performed well. It then toured the country and was later exhibited overseas.

The promotional image of Hinemoa featured on the 40c stamp of the New Zealand Post 1996 "Centenary of New Zealand Cinema" stamp issue.

The New Zealand Film Archive lists in its holdings tape of an undated radio interview with George Tarr and Hera Tawhai Rodgers about the making of the film. (Rodgers was 76 at the time of the interview, so it was probably in the 1960s)

References

1910s New Zealand films
New Zealand silent films
1914 films
Lost New Zealand films
Films set in New Zealand
Films shot in New Zealand
Films about Māori people